John Carl Lohmeyer (born January 15, 1951) is a former American football defensive lineman who played four seasons with the Kansas City Chiefs of the National Football League. He was drafted by the Kansas City Chiefs in the fourth round of the 1973 NFL Draft. He played college football at Emporia State University and attended Emporia High School in Emporia, Kansas.

College career
Lohmeyer played college football for the Emporia State Hornets. He was inducted into the Emporia State University Athletics Hall of Honor in 1983.

Professional career

Kansas City Chiefs
Lohmeyer was selected by the Kansas City Chiefs with the 89th pick in the 1973 NFL Draft. He played in 41 games, starting fifteen, for the Chiefs from 1973 to 1977. He was also a special teams captain for the Chiefs for three years.

Personal life
Lohmeyer spent ten years as a partner and broker for an insurance agency. He also has ten years of experience in the banking and finance industry. He joined the Emporia State University Foundation as a major gift officer in 2011 and has served as the Foundation's Director of Development.

References

External links
Just Sports Stats

1951 births
Living people
Players of American football from Kansas
American football defensive linemen
Emporia High School alumni
Emporia State Hornets football players
Kansas City Chiefs players
20th-century American businesspeople
American brokers
American businesspeople in insurance
Businesspeople from Kansas
People from Emporia, Kansas